Real World: Go Big or Go Home is the thirty-first season of MTV's reality television series Real World, which focuses on a group of diverse strangers living together for several months in a different city each season, as cameras document their lives and interpersonal relationships. It is the fourth season to be filmed in the Mountain States region of the United States, specifically in Nevada after The Real World: Las Vegas (2011).

The season featured a total of eight (initially seven) people who lived in a penthouse suite in Downtown Las Vegas and follows a twist from the previous two seasons. Las Vegas was first reported as the location for the 31st season by the website DTLV.com on September 15, 2015. It is the third season of Real World to be filmed in Las Vegas and the ninth season to take place in a city that had hosted a previous season, following the twelfth and twenty-fifth seasons, which aired in 2002–03 and 2011, respectively.  Production began on October 9, 2015, and concluded on December 16, 2015 totaling up to 70 days of filming.

On January 13, 2016, Entertainment Weekly reported that the season will be titled Go Big or Go Home. An additional twist is that it features the cast members performing Road Rules-type missions in order to remain on the show. Unlike Road Rules, some missions will be individual-based, some will involve a portion of the group, and some will be team-based. The season premiered on March 17, 2016, and concluded on May 26, 2016, with the season finale, consisting of 12 episodes; it is the first season of the series to premiere simultaneously on MTV and the MTV app's livestream.

Season changes
On this season, all cast members will undergo missions to stay in the house (either by an individual, some or all), similar to the missions based on Road Rules. If one cast member chose not to do the mission, they will be forced to leave the group.

Employment
Beginning in the 28th season, certain jobs in the area were approved by production that the cast had the liberty to apply for independently if desired.  Kailah and Chris worked at Downtown Podcast in Downtown Las Vegas, but this went unaired.

The residence
In contrast to the previous two seasons in Las Vegas, which were filmed in 2002–03 at the Palms Casino Resort and in 2011 at the Hard Rock Hotel and Casino, the residence for this season was in a converted penthouse suite at Gold Spike in Downtown Las Vegas.

Cast
This was the fifth season of Real World to feature a roster of eight roommates living together. The season started with seven cast members until the additional roommate was introduced in the ninth episode.

 Age at start of filming

Duration of cast 

Notes

Missions

Additional missions Fear, Yes, Speed, and Fall also took part but were not aired. Fear required Kailah to be in a cave of bats, Speed involved the cast driving rally trucks, Yes required Chris to say yes to what his roommates asked of him for the day, and Fall required the cast to rappel down a cliff. Fall did not include CeeJai' and Jenna as both had been removed from the show by the time of the mission. Fall can be seen in the season's trailer.

Episodes

After filming

Sabrina Kennedy's first EP, Lioness, was released August 21, 2016. In 2019, she released the single "Hold Tight", which was featured on Love Island and The Only Way Is Essex. Her latest single, "The Other Side" was released in late 2020. Kennedy also made her acting debut in the movie Habitual directed by Johnny Hickey, which also featured Chris Tamburello from The Real World: Paris and Emilee Fitzpatrick from The Real World: Cancun.

After their appearance on The Challenge, Ammo talked about being raped by a former partner and suffering PTSD, which caused their collapse after the elimination round against Jordan Wiseley from The Real World: Portland. On December 18, 2018, Ammo released their first single, "Macy". In 2019, Ammo (who now goes by the name "Amo") revealed they started taking hormones for transitioning.

In 2019, Kailah Casillas appeared as an ambassador on MTV's Lindsay Lohan's Beach Club. In the same year, she appeared on How Far Is Tattoo Far? with her then–boyfriend, Mikey P from From G's to Gents. In 2022, Casillas married fellow reality star Sam Bird.

The Challenge

Challenge in bold indicates that the contestant was a finalist on The Challenge.

References

External links
 Official site. MTV.com
 Real World: Go Big or Go Home Trailer. MTV.com

Go Big or Go Home
Television shows set in the Las Vegas Valley
2016 American television seasons
Television shows shot in the Las Vegas Valley